The Maspalomas Challenger is a professional tennis tournament played on clay courts. It is part of the Association of Tennis Professionals (ATP) Challenger Tour. It is held in Maspalomas, Spain.

Past finals

Singles

Doubles

References

ATP Challenger Tour
Clay court tennis tournaments
Tennis tournaments in Spain